In archaeology, a grattoir de côté (French for side scraper) is a ridged variety of steep-scraper distinguished by a working edge on one side. They were found at various archaeological sites in Lebanon including Ain Cheikh and Jdeideh II and are suggested to date to Upper Paleolithic stages three or four (Levantine Aurignacian).

References

Tools
Lithics
Levantine Aurignacian